Paradinia is a genus of moths in the subfamily Arctiinae. It contains the single species Paradinia chrysogastrides, which is found in Colombia.

References

External Links 
Natural History Museum Lepidoptera generic names catalog

Arctiinae